Romany hip hop is a musical genre from Eastern Europe, formed through a fusion of hip hop with Romany beats and lyrics.

Artists include Kmetoband and Gipsy.cz.

See also

 Romani Music

 Romani people

Hip hop genres
Romanian hip hop